Angelo Nino Vittorio Rovelli, known simply as Nino Rovelli (Olgiate Olona, June 10, 1917 – Zürich, December 30, 1990) was an Italian bobsledder and entrepreneur who competed in the late 1940s. He finished 11th in the four-man event at the 1948 Winter Olympics in St. Moritz.

Works 

 Il romanzo degli stranieri, 1985  Rizzoli (in Italian)
 Le stelle del Milan, 1986  Siad Edizioni (in Italian)
 Azzurri 1910-1983, storia della nazionale di calcio tre volte campione del mondo, 1983 Rizzoli (in Italian; co-author Enzo Baroni)
 Il Romanzo Della Coppa Rimet 1930-1966, 1966 Bietti (in Italian)

References

External links

1948 bobsleigh four-man results
Nino Rovelli's profile at Sports Reference.com

Olympic bobsledders of Italy
Bobsledders at the 1948 Winter Olympics
Italian male bobsledders
1917 births
1990 deaths